Ardclinis is a civil parish and townland (of 35 acres) in County Antrim, Northern Ireland. It is situated in the historic barony of Glenarm Lower.

Civil parish of Ardclinis
The civil parish covers areas within the boundaries of Causeway Coast and Glens Borough Council and Mid and East Antrim Borough Council and includes the village of Carnlough.

Townlands
The civil parish contains the following townlands:

A
Aghalum, Ardclinis, Ardclinis Mountain

B
Ballyvelligan, Bay, Burnside

C
Callisnagh, Carnlough North, Carnlough South, Carrivemurphy Mountain, Carrivereagh, Cloghcor, Clonreagh, Craignagat, Creggan, Cushenilt

D
Diskirt, Drumadried, Drumnacross, Drumnacur, Drumnasole, Dunmall

F
Fallowvee, Falmacbreed, Falrusklin

G
Galboly Lower, Galboly Mountain North, Galboly Mountain South, Galboly Upper, Gallanagh, Glenariff Mountain Upper East, Glenariff Mountain Upper West, Glenariff Mountain Lower, Gortin, Gortnagory, Greenaghan

H
Highlandtown

J
John Gillins

L
Lemnalary, Lemnalary Mountain, Longtown, Loughan

M
Mill Tenement

N
Nappan Mountain, Nappan North, Nappan South, Newtown

S
Scaryhill, Slate House

T
Tamlaght, Tamlaghtmore, Two Acres and Half

W
Warren

See also 
List of townlands in County Antrim
List of civil parishes of County Antrim

References

Townlands of County Antrim